Oestrophasia clausa is a species of bristle fly in the family Tachinidae.

Distribution
Canada, United States.

References

Dexiinae
Taxa named by Friedrich Moritz Brauer
Taxa named by Julius von Bergenstamm
Insects described in 1889
Diptera of North America